Semne în pustiu (Signs in the Desert) is a 1996 short film directed by Nicolas Masson.

Plot
The movie is the one-day story of a famous writer, touched with paralysis, whose faith cannot help him overcome his frustrations, and mostly the jealousy aroused by a woman too young and beautiful to be his wife.

Cast
(in alphabetical order)

 Mircea Albulescu
 Dan Condurache
 Rona Hartner
 Nicolas Masson
 Cesonia Postelnicu
 Marian Ralea
 Boby Torok
 Dodo Voitis

External links

1996 films
1990s Romanian-language films
1996 drama films
Romanian short films
Romanian drama films
1996 short films